The Middlesex Greenway is a long-distance walking route along the western and northern edges of the historic county of Middlesex, in the United Kingdom.

The route is 45 miles long and was devised by Stephen Collins, who walked it over two days in 1990.

The trailheads are:

Staines-upon-Thames 
North of Enfield Lock

References

UK Trailwalkers Handbook, p77

External links
Middlesex Greenway on WildþingUK
Long Distance Walkers Association: The Middlesex Greenway

Long-distance footpaths in England
County-themed walking routes in the United Kingdom
Footpaths in London